Robert Behling (born 28 March 1991) is a German slalom canoeist who has competed at the international level since 2006.

He won four medals at the ICF Canoe Slalom World Championships with two silvers (C2 team: 2009, 2015) and two bronzes (C2: 2017, C2 team: 2010). He also won five medals at the European Championships (2 golds, 1 silver and 2 bronzes).

He won the overall World Cup title in the C2 class in 2017.

His partner in the C2 boat is Thomas Becker.

World Cup individual podiums

References

2010 ICF Canoe Slalom World Championships 11 September 2010 C2 men's team final results. - accessed 11 September 2010.
12 September 2009 final results for the men's C2 team slalom event for the 2009 ICF Canoe Slalom World Championships. - accessed 12 September 2009.

External links

German male canoeists
Living people
1991 births
Medalists at the ICF Canoe Slalom World Championships